Michel Goma (12 March 1932 – 18 April 2022) was a French fashion designer who was the creative director of Balenciaga from 1987 to 1992, after the label was relaunched following a 19-year closure.

Goma was born on 12 March 1932 in Moncrabeau, Lot-et-Garonne.

References

1932 births
2022 deaths
People from Lot-et-Garonne
French fashion designers